Walto may refer to:

 Waldo of Reichenau (740–814), sometimes spelled Walto, Carolingian abbot and bishop
 Walto Tuomioja (1888–1931), Finnish lawyer, journalist and politician
 Walto Tribe, a subclan of the Tyari Assyrian tribe
 Ceylanlı, Hakkâri (Kurdish: Walto), Turkey, a village
 Dokor Walto, a character in Isaac Asimov's novel Foundation

See also
 Stanisław Waltoś (born 1932), Polish legal scholar and academic
 Waldo (disambiguation)

Masculine given names